A shed roof, also known variously as a pent roof, lean-to roof, outshot, catslide, skillion roof (in Australia and New Zealand), and, rarely, a mono-pitched roof, is a single-pitched roof surface. This is in contrast to a dual- or multiple-pitched roof.

An outshot or catslide roof is a pitched extension of a main roof similar to a lean-to but an extension of the upper roof.  Some Saltbox homes were created by the addition of such a roof, often at a shallower pitch than the original roof.

Applications

A single-pitched roof can be a smaller addition to an existing roof, known in some areas as a lean-to roof.

Single-pitched roofs are used beneath clerestory windows.

One or more single-pitched roofs can be used for aesthetic consideration(s).

A form of single-pitched roof with multiple roof surfaces is the sawtooth roof.

See also
 List of roof shapes

References

Roofs